George Copeland Hawkins Jr. (December 4, 1918 – August 9, 1991), was an Alabama lawyer and Democratic politician who served in the Alabama House of Representatives in the 1950s.

He attended the 1948 Democratic National Convention as an alternate delegate.

He died in 1991 of kidney failure and was buried in Forrest Cemetery in Gadsden.

References

1918 births
1991 deaths
Democratic Party members of the Alabama House of Representatives
Democratic Party Alabama state senators
Alabama lawyers
Deaths from kidney failure
20th-century American lawyers
20th-century American politicians
American United Methodists
Politicians from Gadsden, Alabama
20th-century Methodists